The men's doubles tennis event of the 2015 Pan American Games was held from July 11–15 at the Canadian Tennis Centre in Toronto, Canada.

Seeds

Draw

Finals

Top half

Bottom half

References

Men's Doubles